Mount Starr King is a mountain located in Coos County, New Hampshire. The mountain is named after Thomas Starr King (1824–1864), and is part of the Pliny Range of the White Mountains.  Mt. Starr King is flanked to the east by Mount Waumbek, and to the northwest by Haystack Mountain. Starr King is drained by various brooks into the Israel River, and thence into the Connecticut River and Long Island Sound.

The Willard Basin Ski Area development was proposed and surveyed for the northern slope of Mount Starr King in the mid-1960s.  An aerial tramway ski lift and hotel were planned to be constructed on the summit of the peak.

See also

 List of mountains in New Hampshire
 White Mountain National Forest
 Mount Starr King in California

References

External links
 
  PeakBagger.com: Starr King
 Willard Basin Ski Area - New England's Cancelled Ski Areas

Mountains of New Hampshire
Mountains of Coös County, New Hampshire